Remarks on the Foundations of Mathematics is a  book of Ludwig Wittgenstein's notes on the philosophy of mathematics. It has been translated from German to English by G.E.M. Anscombe, edited by G.H. von Wright and Rush Rhees, and published first in 1956. The text has been produced from passages in various sources by selection and editing. The notes have been written during the years 1937–1944 and a few passages are  incorporated in the Philosophical Investigations which were composed later. When the book appeared it received many negative reviews mostly from working logicians and mathematicians, among them  Michael Dummett, Paul Bernays, and Georg Kreisel. Today Remarks on the Foundations of Mathematics is read mostly by philosophers sympathetic to Wittgenstein and they tend to adopt a more positive stance.

Wittgenstein's philosophy of mathematics is exposed chiefly by simple examples on which further skeptical comments are made. The text offers an extended analysis of the concept of mathematical proof and an exploration of Wittgenstein's contention that philosophical considerations introduce false problems  in mathematics. Wittgenstein in the Remarks adopts an attitude of doubt in opposition to much orthodoxy in the philosophy of mathematics.

 Particularly controversial in the Remarks was Wittgenstein's "notorious paragraph", which contained an unusual commentary on Gödel's incompleteness theorems. Multiple commentators  read Wittgenstein as misunderstanding Gödel. In 2000  Juliet Floyd and Hilary Putnam suggested that the majority of commentary misunderstands 
Wittgenstein but their interpretation  has not been met with approval.

Wittgenstein wrote 

The debate has been running  around the so-called Key Claim: If one assumes that P is provable in PM, then one should give up the "translation" of P by the English sentence "P is not provable".

Wittgenstein does not mention the name of Kurt Gödel who was a member of the Vienna Circle during the period in which Wittgenstein's early ideal language philosophy and Tractatus Logico-Philosophicus dominated the circle's thinking; multiple writings of Gödel in his Nachlass contain his own antipathy for Wittgenstein, and belief that Wittgenstein wilfully misread the theorems. Some commentators, such as Rebecca Goldstein, have hypothesized that Gödel developed his logical theorems in opposition to Wittgenstein.

References

External links
Sorin Bangu, Ludwig Wittgenstein: Later Philosophy of Mathematics, IEP
Victor Rodych, Wittgenstein's Philosophy of Mathematics, The Stanford Encyclopedia of Philosophy

1953 non-fiction books
Ludwig Wittgenstein
Books by Ludwig Wittgenstein
Philosophy of mathematics literature
Logic literature